The President of Iran is the second formal position after the Supreme leader. The president has the authority to introduce members of his cabinet to the Iranian Parliament for confirmation under the Constitution of Iran.

Rouhani is the seventh president of Iran which governed within the eleventh government of the Islamic Republic of Iran.

Cabinet members

Vice presidents
Rouhani appointed Jahangiri as the first vice president. Elham Aminzadeh is another Vice President, who was appointed by Rouhani as his vice president for legal affairs on 11 August. Mohammad Bagher Nobakht is the other vice president in the cabinet and he is in charge of planning and strategic supervision.

Ministers

Rouhani announced his designated cabinet on 4 August 2013. Then, parliament voted to his cabinet. The voting process was begun on 12 August and was ended on 15 August. The voting was held on 15 August and three of the eighteen nominees were not approved by the Majlis, those proposed to head the ministries of education, science, research and technology; and sports and youth.

Cabinet members 

|-
!colspan=6|
|-

Reception
The list of cabinet members received mixed reactions from the Iranian press. Reformist dailies mostly expressed positive statements about the nominated cabinet members whereas Shargh, another reformist paper, regarded the list both satisfactory and unsatisfactory, claiming that it includes a "non-partisan and moderate government" featuring figures from all political parties. Kayhan, on the other hand, criticized the nomination of oil minister, Bijan Namdar Zanganeh.

On 8 August 2013, three international organizations, namely Reporters Without Borders, the International Campaign for Human Rights in Iran, and Human Rights Watch, requested the withdrawal of Mostafa Pourmohammadi's nomination for the post of justice minister due to his controversial past tenure. Revolutionary Guards Major General Mohammad Ali Jafari criticised Rouhani's administration in December 2013: "The military, systems and procedures governing the administrative system of the country are the same as before, [but it] has been slightly modified and unfortunately infected by Western doctrine, and a fundamental change must occur. The main threat to the revolution is in the political arena and the Guards cannot remain silent in the face of that."

See also
Government of Iran

References

Presidency of Hassan Rouhani
2013 establishments in Iran
Iran
Rouhani